Tommaso D'Apice (born 30 June 1988) is an Italian rugby union footballer who plays as a hooker. D'Apice was part of the Italian squad at the 2011 Rugby World Cup and joined Aironi after the tournament. After Aironi were disbanded he joined Gloucester Rugby. Following his departure from Gloucester, Tommaso D Apice has signed a contract to return to Italy to join Zebre for the new season.

References

External links
ESPN Profile
2011 Rugby World Cup Profile

1988 births
Sportspeople from Benevento
Living people
Aironi players
Italian rugby union players
Rugby union hookers
Italy international rugby union players
Italian expatriate rugby union players
Expatriate rugby union players in England
Italian expatriate sportspeople in England
Gloucester Rugby players
Rugby Calvisano players
Rugby Roma Olimpic players